Ur-nigin, also Ur-nigina (ur-niŋin) or Ur-nigar (ur-ni-gar) was a Governor (ensi) of Uruk who lived in 22nd century BCE.

According to the Sumerian King List, Ur-Nigin destroyed the Akkadian Empire, which had probably already be weakened by the Gutians, and established a short-lived Fifth Dynasty of Uruk. 

The Sumerian King List, describing the confusion of the decline of the Akkadian Empire after the death of Shar-kali-shari, mentions the rule of several kings, among them Ur-Nigin:

Ur-Nigin is also mentioned in several votive inscriptions by his son Ur-gigir. One of them reads:

The Fourth Dynasty of Uruk was finally destroyed by the Gutian Dynasty.

See also

History of Mesopotamia

References

|-

22nd-century BC Sumerian kings
Kings of Uruk
Sumerian kings